Roman Perko (born 12 May 1977) is a Slovenian skier. He competed in the Nordic combined event at the 1998 Winter Olympics.

References

1977 births
Living people
Slovenian male Nordic combined skiers
Olympic Nordic combined skiers of Slovenia
Nordic combined skiers at the 1998 Winter Olympics
People from Tržič